Donald Walter Webster (July 3, 1924 – April 12, 1978) was a Canadian professional ice hockey player who played 27 games in the National Hockey League with the Toronto Maple Leafs during the 1943–44 season. The rest of his career, which lasted from 1942 to 1953, was spent in various minor leagues. Webster was born in Toronto, Ontario, and his older brother of Chick, also played in the NHL.

Career statistics

Regular season and playoffs

References 
 

1924 births
1978 deaths
Buffalo Bisons (AHL) players
Canadian ice hockey left wingers
Fort Worth Rangers players
Hershey Bears players
Los Angeles Monarchs players
Providence Reds players
San Diego Skyhawks players
Shawinigan-Falls Cataracts (QSHL) players
Ice hockey people from Toronto
Toronto Maple Leafs players
Toronto Marlboros players
Tulsa Oilers (USHL) players
Vancouver Canucks (WHL) players
Washington Lions players